The Detroit Football Company was an American syndicate which owned the Detroit Lions of the National Football League from 1948 to 1963.

On January 15, 1948, the NFL owners unanimously approved the sale of the Lions from Fred L. Mandel Jr. to a seven-person syndicate. The original members were
D. Lyle Fife, owner of an electrical supply company
Edwin J. Anderson, president of the Goebel Brewing Company
William D. Downey, president of the Kinsel Drug Co.
Charles T. Fisher Jr., bank president
Walter Briggs Jr., son of Detroit Tigers owner Walter Briggs Sr.
Arthur Hoffman, pharmaceutical executive
Harry Wismer, sports announcer

Attorney Philip Hart helped negotiate the sale and was given the title of assistant secretary-treasurer, but held no stock.

Fife became team president and pledged that the syndicate would invest around $300,000 in the team, which had been in debt under Mandel's ownership. He also stated that the group planned to add more members and hoped to operate like Green Bay Packers, Inc. C. Ray Davisson, George Cavanaugh, William Clay Ford Sr., and Ralph Wilson were among the stockholders who later joined the company.

During the 1949 season, Fife left his wife of 33 years for his secretary. The resulting scandal saw Fife resign and Anderson take over as president. Over the next seven seasons, the Lions won three NFL championships and four division titles.

In 1961, a group of stockholders led by Fife attempted to remove Anderson as team president. Anderson resigned and one of his supporters, William Clay Ford Sr., was chosen to succeed him. Anderson was allowed to stay on as general manager.

On November 22, 1963, 135 of the team's 144 stockholders voted to sell the team to Ford for $6 million. The deal was closed on January 10, 1964, and the Detroit Football Company was dissolved.

References

Detroit Lions owners
Companies based in Detroit
American companies established in 1947
American companies disestablished in 1964